The 2008 PGA Tour of Australasia was a series of men's professional golf events played mainly in Australia and New Zealand. The main tournaments on the PGA Tour of Australasia are played in the southern summer so they are split between the first and last months of the year. The tour's developmental series, known as the Von Nida Tour was played in the middle of the year.

Schedule
The following table lists official events during the 2008 season.

Order of Merit
The Order of Merit was based on prize money won during the season, calculated in Australian dollars.

Von Nida Tour

The 2008 Von Nida Tour was the sixth and final season of the Von Nida Tour, the official development tour of the PGA Tour of Australasia between 2003 and 2008. In October, it was announced that the Von Nida Tour events would be absorbed into the main tour from the start of 2009.

Schedule
The following table lists official events during the 2008 season.

Order of Merit
The Order of Merit was based on prize money won during the season, calculated in Australian dollars.

Notes

References

External links

PGA Tour of Australasia
Australasia
PGA Tour of Australasia
PGA Tour of Australasia